Vox Sæculorum is an international society of contemporary composers writing in the Baroque style established in 2006. Vox Sæculorum was the primary focus of a feature-length article on period baroque composition written by Grant Colburn and published in the Summer issue of Early Music America Magazine.

Its founding members are:
 Grant Colburn
 Mark Moya
 Giorgio Pacchioni
 Michael Starke
 Roman Turovsky

Other members include: Miguel Robaina, David Jansson, Glen Shannon, Roberto Bancalari, Hendrik Bouman, Matthias Maute, Fernando De Luca, J. Lee Graham, Gianluca Bersanetti, and Timothy Ariel Walden, Mikael Talbot.

References
 Early Music America, 2007 (summer issue).
 Harpsichord and Fortepiano Magazine, 2007 (winter issue).
 Harpsichord and Fortepiano Magazine, 2009 (winter issue).

External links

Vox Sæculorum
Scharffeneck Collection of Early Contemporary Music

21st-century classical composers
Baroque music
Organizations established in 2006
Composition schools
Music organizations based in the United States